The EMD 645 is a  family of diesel engines that was designed and manufactured by the Electro-Motive Division of General Motors. While the 645 series was intended primarily for locomotive, marine and stationary engine use, one 16-cylinder version powered the 33-19 "Titan" prototype haul truck designed by GM's Terex division.

The 645 series was an evolution of the earlier 567 series and a precursor to the later 710 series. First introduced in 1965, the EMD 645 series remained in production on a by-request basis long after it was replaced by the 710, and most 645 service parts are still in production. The EMD 645 engine series is currently supported by Electro-Motive Diesel, Inc., which purchased the assets of the Electro-Motive Division from General Motors in 2005.

In 1951, E. W. Kettering wrote a paper for the ASME entitled, History and Development of the 567 Series General Motors Locomotive Engine, which goes into great detail about the technical obstacles that were encountered during the development of the 567 engine. These same considerations apply to the 645 and 710, as these engines were a logical extension of the 567C, by applying a cylinder bore increase, 645, and a cylinder bore increase and a stroke increase, 710, to achieve a greater power output, without changing the external size of the engines, or their weight, thereby achieving significant improvements in horsepower per unit volume and horsepower per unit weight.

History 
The 645 series engines entered production in 1965. While the crankcase was modified from the 567 series, 567C and later engines (or 567 engines which have been modified to 567C specifications, sometimes referred to as 567AC or 567BC engines) can accept 645 series service parts, such as power assemblies. Conversely, the 567E engine employs a 645E series block with 567 series power assemblies.

All 645 engines utilize either a Roots blower or a turbocharger for cylinder scavenging. For turbocharged engines, the turbocharger is gear-driven and has a centrifugal clutch that allows it to act as a centrifugal blower at low engine speeds (when exhaust gas flow and temperature alone are insufficient to drive the turbine) and a purely exhaust-driven turbocharger at higher speeds. The turbocharger can revert to acting as a supercharger during demands for large increases in engine output power. While more expensive to maintain than Roots blowers, EMD claims that this design allows "significantly" reduced fuel consumption and emissions, improved high-altitude performance, and even up to a 50 percent increase in maximum rated horsepower over Roots-blown engines for the same engine displacement.

Turbocharging effectively eliminates this derating.

The 645 series has a maximum engine speed of between 900 and 950 revolutions per minute (rpm), an increase over the 800 to 900 rpm maximum speed for the 567 series.  An engine speed of 900 rpm was essential for 60 Hz stationary power generator applications and certain passenger locomotives equipped with 60 Hz, 480-volt three-phase "head-end power" systems.  When used solely for traction purposes, the engine speed varies depending on the throttle position. The 950 rpm maximum speed of the 645F engine proved to be too high, thereby compromising its reliability, and the replacement engine, the 710G, reverted to 900 rpm maximum speed.

EMD built an SD40 demonstrator (number 434) in July 1964 to field test the 16-645E3 engine, followed by another eight SD40 demonstrators (numbers 434A through 434H) and a GP40 demonstrator (number 433A) in 1965.  In December 1965 and January 1966, EMD built three SD45 demonstrators (numbers 4351 through 4353) to field test the 20-645E3 engine.

When the 645 engine entered production in 1965, a large series of new locomotive models was introduced. EMD also introduced the Roots-blown 38 Series (GP38, SD38) and turbocharged, twelve-cylinder 39 Series (GP39, SD39). All of these locomotive models extensively share common components and subsystems, thereby significantly reducing cost and increasing interchangeability. The GP38-2 and SD40-2 became the most popular models of the series and among the most popular locomotive models ever built.

Starting with the introduction of the 645 series engines, EMD's model naming convention generally increased model designs by ten (such as with the 40, 50, 60 and 70 series).  The number was reduced by one for twelve-cylinder versions (such as the 39, 49 and 59 series); reduced by two for Roots-blown versions (for the 38 series); and increased by five for higher-horsepower versions (such as the 45 and 75 series).

Unlike the 645 series, the 710 is not offered from the factory as a Roots-blown model, but nothing in the basic design of that engine prevents such an offering. However, a pair of Roots blowers which would be required for a Roots-blown 710 series likely would be too large (too long) to fit in the available carbody space, and making a special carbody just for the very few likely to be ordered would be economically unsound. Therefore, any 710 engine using Roots blowers would need the blowers added to the engine after delivery.

Specifications (many are common to 567 and 710 engines) 
All 645 engines are two-stroke 45-degree V-engines. The engine is a uniflow design with four poppet-type exhaust valves in the cylinder head and charge air scavenging ports within the sides of the cylinders. All engines use a single overhead camshaft per bank, with exhaust valves operated by two cam lobes (each of which operates two exhaust valves through a "bridge") and one cam lobe to operate the Unit injector which is in the center of the four exhaust valves. Rocker arms are roller-equipped to reduce friction while hydraulic valve actuators are used to reduce valve lash. Post-1995 710 engines employ Electronic Unit injectors, however these injectors still utilize a camshaft-actuated piston pump, as on non-EFI injectors.

Cylinders in each V-pair are directly opposite each other, and the connecting rods are of a fork-and-blade arrangement, with "fork" rods on one bank of cylinders and "blade" rods on the other (with the same stroke on both banks). (In contrast, General Electric's 7FDL and 7FDM engines use "articulated" master-and-slave connecting rods, essentially two adjacent cylinders on a radial engine, and have a slightly longer stroke on the bank using slave rods.) The engines are provided with either a single or twin Roots blower, or a single mechanically-assisted turbocharger, depending on required power output.

For maintenance, a power assembly, consisting of a cylinder head, cylinder liner, piston, piston carrier and piston rod can be individually replaced relatively easily and quickly.  The engine block is made from flat, formed and rolled structural steel members and steel forgings welded into a single structure (a "weldment"), so it can easily be repaired using conventional shop tools.

Orientation: The "front" of the engine (the engine governor and fluid pump end) is actually at the rear end of the locomotive, immediately adjacent to the locomotive's coolant supply and cooling system; the "rear" of the engine (the induction system and traction generator or alternator end) is at the front end of the locomotive, immediately adjacent to the locomotive's electrical cabinet. 
Rotation: Engine rotation is in the conventional clockwise direction, as viewed from the "front" of the engine, but is in a counterclockwise direction, as viewed from the front of the locomotive. Marine and stationary installations are available with either a left or a right-hand rotating engine.
Firing order
Eight cylinder: 1, 5, 3, 7, 4, 8, 2, 6
Twelve cylinder: 1, 7, 4, 10, 2, 8, 6, 12, 3, 9, 5, 11
Sixteen cylinder: 1, 8, 9, 16, 3, 6, 11, 14, 4, 5, 12, 13, 2, 7, 10, 15
Twenty cylinder: 1, 19, 8, 11, 5, 18, 7, 15, 2, 17, 10, 12, 3, 20, 6, 13, 4, 16, 9, 14
Exhaust valves: Four per cylinder
Main bearings
Eight cylinder: 5 (one-piece crankshaft)
Twelve cylinder: 7 (one-piece crankshaft)
Sixteen cylinder: 10 (two-piece crankshaft, pinned and bolted in the middle)
Twenty cylinder: 12 (two-piece crankshaft, pinned and bolted in the middle)
Fuel injection: Unit injector; Electronic unit injector in post-1995 engines
Engine starting
AC traction generator: Dual electric starting motors, parallel-connected 64 volt starters in early applications, series-connected 32 volt starters in late applications
DC traction generator: Generator series field
AC power generator: Dual pneumatic starters in most stationary engine applications
Engine Control
Woodward PGE locomotive governor, or equivalent, in mechanical engines; EMD engine control unit in electronic engines
Weight (E3B turbocharged models)
Eight cylinder: 22,050 pounds (10.0 tonnes)
Twelve cylinder: 28,306 pounds (12.8 tonnes)
Sixteen cylinder: 36,425 pounds (16.5 tonnes)
Twenty cylinder: 43,091 pounds (19.5 tonnes)

Versions

Stationary/marine versions
Like most EMD engines, the 645 is also sold for stationary and marine applications.

Stationary and marine installations are available with either a left or right-hand rotating engine.

Marine engines differ from railroad and stationary engines mainly in the shape and depth of the engine's oil sump, which has been altered to accommodate the rolling and pitching motions encountered in marine applications.

Engine Speed
Full . . 900 RPM for 60 Hz power generation; 750 RPM for 50 Hz power generation; variable up to 900 RPM for marine applications
Idle . . 350 RPM
Compression Ratio . . 16:1
Brake Horsepower (ABS Rating)
Model 645E6 Engines - 900 RPM
8-cylinder . . . .1050
12-cylinder . . . 1500
16-cylinder . . . 1950
Model 645E7C/F7B Engines - 800 RPM / 900 RPM
8-cylinder . . . . ---- / 1525
12-cylinder . . . .2305 / 2550
16-cylinder . . . .3070 / 3400
20-cylinder . . . .3600 / 4000

See also 
 EMD 567
 EMD 710
 EMD 1010

Notes

References

External links

 
 

Diesel locomotive engines
Marine diesel engines
Two-stroke diesel engines
V6 engines
V8 engines